Mohammad Nawaz Khan (commonly known as Nawaz Deobandi; born 16 June 1956) is an Indian Urdu language poet. He is also a Ghazal writer some of them are sung by famous Ghazal singer Jagjit Singh.

Education 
 Doctorate  in literature D.Lit form Jamia Urdu Aligarh
 Ph.D. Urdu (CCS University, Meerut)
 M.A. Urdu (CCS University, Meerut)
 B.Com (CCS University, Meerut)
 Adeeb Kamil (Jamia Urdu Aligarh)
 Muallim Urdu (Jamia Urdu Aligarh)

Performance 
Nawaz Deobandi  has attended more than 5000 poetic symposiums Mushairas & Kavi Samelans  in various city's of India and have also traveled to USA, UK, UAE, Australia, Canada, Singapore, KSA, Kuwait, Qatar, Bahrain, Oman, Pakistan, etc.

Books 
 Pahla Aasman
Sawaneh Ulma-e-Deoband

Awards 
 Yash Bharati Government of Uttar Pradesh -2016

References 

Urdu-language poets from India
1956 births
Living people
Poets from Uttar Pradesh
20th-century Indian Muslims
21st-century Indian Muslims
20th-century Indian poets
21st-century Indian poets
Indian ghazal singers
People from Deoband
Ghazal